Men for Sale (literally "men for rent") is a 2008 documentary film by Canadian director Rodrigue Jean, about male prostitutes working in Montreal, Quebec, Canada. The film was shot over a one-year period in Montreal's Gay Village.

The interviews for Hommes à louer are in French language. The English version Men for Sale has subtitles in English.

Canadian National Film Board calls the documentary "an unflinching portrait with neither voyeurism nor false sympathy acknowledging those society prefers to ignore".

Synopsis
The documentary follows the life of 11 male prostitutes over the course of a year, recounting their struggles to survive alcohol and drug-related addictions, abuse and stigmatization – and, their troubled pasts.

Trapped in a vicious circle of prostitution and drugs, they pursue their lives, realizing their prospects for the future are dim.

Festivals
In 2009, the documentary was an official selection for:
Festival du Nouveau Cinéma
Festival d'Avignon (63rd season)
Festival international du cinéma francophone en Acadie (FICFA) (23rd season)
Atlantic Film Festival

References

External links
National Film Board page for Men for Sale

Men for Sale - YouTube Trailers

2008 films
Canadian documentary films
Canadian LGBT-related films
Films directed by Rodrigue Jean
Quebec films
Documentary films about Montreal
National Film Board of Canada documentaries
Documentary films about male prostitution
2008 documentary films
2008 LGBT-related films
Documentary films about prostitution in Canada
Films about male prostitution in Canada
French-language Canadian films
2000s Canadian films